Putting It Straight is a rock album by Pat Travers. It was released in 1977 on Polydor Records.

The songs were listed on the back cover of the album in a different sequence than on the original LP pressing.  Some later CD versions had the songs in the incorrect order as listed on the back cover. "Getting' Betta" was a track that was often played in Travers' late 70s sets and "Dedication" remains a stand out song on the album.

Original LP track listing
All tracks composed by Pat Travers; except where indicated

Side One
"Life in London" - 4:22
"It Ain't What It Seems" - 4:13 
"Speakeasy" - 3:18
"Runnin' from the Future" - 3:47 
"Lovin' You" - 4:03

Side Two
"Off Beat Ride" - 4:36 
"Gettin' Betta" - 4:45 (Peter Cowling, Travers)
"Dedication Parts 1 & 2" - 7:55

Incorrect CD track sequence
"Life in London"
"Gettin' Betta"
"Runnin' from the Future"
"It Ain't What It Seems"
"Off Beat Ride"
"Lovin' You"
"Dedication"
"Speakeasy"

Personnel
Peter 'Mars' Cowling - bass
Nicko McBrain - drums
Pat Travers - guitar, keyboard, vocals

Additional personnel
Tony Carey - Synthesizer mini Moog on "Off Beat Ride"
Scott Gorham - additional guitar on "Speakeasy"
Bert Hermiston - saxophone on "Dedication" and "Off Beat Ride"
Susie McKinley - background vocals on "Lovin' You"

Charts
Album - Billboard

References 

1977 albums
Pat Travers albums
Polydor Records albums